Stade St. Claude is a multi-use stadium in Basse-Terre, Guadeloupe. The stadium is home to the Guadeloupe national football team. It is currently used mostly for football matches. The stadium holds 4,000. It is currently used by football teams Racing Club de Basse-Terre and La Gauloise de Basse-Terre.

References

Football venues in Guadeloupe
Athletics (track and field) venues in Guadeloupe
Guadeloupe